
Saint Sæthryth (fl. 660s), also called Sedrido, Sethrida or Saethrid, was the stepdaughter of king Anna of East Anglia. 

Sæthryth was sent to the Abbey of Faremoutiers in Brie to be educated, and became a Benedictine nun,  under its foundress Saint Burgundofara, whom she succeeded as abbess. Saints Seaxburh, Ethelburga, Etheldreda and Withburga were half-sisters.

Feast Day
Her feast day is January 7, formerly January 10.

See also
 Chronological list of saints in the 7th century

References

External links
 

Anglo-Saxon nuns
East Anglian saints
Benedictine nuns
7th-century deaths
7th-century English nuns
7th-century Christian saints
Year of birth unknown
Christian female saints of the Middle Ages